Bethlehem Silk Mill is a historic silk mill complex located in Bethlehem, Northampton County, Pennsylvania.  It was built in 1886, and expanded about 1896 and about 1901.  The complex once consisted of a total of seven interconnected historic buildings that formed an open rectangular plan around two central courtyards. Some of the buildings have been demolished. All of the buildings were constructed of red brick with stone foundations.

It was added to the National Register of Historic Places in 2005.

References

Industrial buildings and structures on the National Register of Historic Places in Pennsylvania
Industrial buildings completed in 1890
Buildings and structures in Northampton County, Pennsylvania
Silk mills in the United States
National Register of Historic Places in Northampton County, Pennsylvania